Minka is a 1995 short film by Guinean director Mohamed Camara treating the controversial subject of child suicide.

References

External links
 Minka

1995 films
1995 drama films
Guinean short films
French drama short films
1995 short films
Guinean drama films
1990s French films